John Warren Davis (February 11, 1888July 12, 1980) was an American educator, college administrator, and civil rights leader. He was the fifth and longest-serving president of West Virginia State University in Institute, West Virginia, a position he held from 1919 to 1953. Born in Milledgeville, Georgia, Davis relocated to Atlanta in 1903 to attend high school at Atlanta Baptist College (later known as Morehouse College). He worked his way through high school and college at Morehouse and graduated with a Bachelor of Arts degree in 1911. At Morehouse, Davis formed associations with John Hope, Mordecai Wyatt Johnson, Samuel Archer, Benjamin Griffith Brawley, Booker T. Washington, and W. E. B. Du Bois. He completed graduate studies in chemistry and physics at the University of Chicago from 1911 to 1913 and served on the faculty of Morehouse as the registrar and as a professor in chemistry and physics. While in Atlanta, Davis helped to found one of the city's first chapters of the National Association for the Advancement of Colored People (NAACP).

Davis served as the executive secretary of the Twelfth Street YMCA in Washington, D.C., from 1917 to 1919 when he was elected as the president of West Virginia Collegiate Institute. Under his leadership the school, (later renamed West Virginia State College), became one of the leading historically black colleges and universities and land-grant universities in the United States, in both academics and athletics. Through Davis' efforts, West Virginia Collegiate Institute became the first African American college to be accredited by the North Central Association of Colleges and Schools (NCA) in 1927. Under his leadership, the college became home to the West Virginia Schools for the Colored Deaf and Blind and to West Virginia's Extension Service for African Americans. Davis also secured a Civilian Pilot Training Program (CPTP) and Army Specialized Training Program (ASTP) unit for the college during World War II. Through his efforts and educational statesmanship, Davis laid the groundwork for West Virginia State's transition into an integrated institution, and white students began enrolling in large numbers toward the end of his presidency.

U.S. President Harry S. Truman appointed Davis as a charter member to the first National Science Board for the National Science Foundation, on which he served from 1950 to 1956. In addition, President Truman appointed Davis as the director of the Technical Cooperation Administration program in Liberia from 1952 to 1954. Davis helped to establish the NAACP Legal Defense and Educational Fund (NAACP LDF), and he served as special director of the NAACP LDF Teacher Information and Security Program from 1955 to 1972. In this role, he administered the NAACP LDF's scholarship programs for African American undergraduate, graduate, and professional students. In his later life, Davis was appointed to the U.S. National Commission for the United Nations Educational, Scientific and Cultural Organization (UNESCO) and served as a member of the Bergen County College board of trustees. Davis continued to work as an active consultant for the NAACP LDF and serve as the head of its Herbert Lehmann Fund until his death in 1980. Davis was a recipient of 14 honorary degrees throughout his lifetime, and he was awarded Haiti's National Order of Honour and Merit (1948) and Liberia's Order of the Star of Africa (1955) for his service to those countries.

Early life and education 
John Warren Davis was born on February 11, 1888, in Milledgeville, Georgia. He was the son of Robert Marion Davis, a merchant, and his wife, Katie Mann Davis. Davis' mother was the biracial daughter of a white pastor. He was raised at his maternal grandfather's home from the age of five, after his parents relocated to Savannah, Georgia, with their other children.

Davis attended elementary school in Milledgeville; however, since there were no public high schools for African Americans in the U.S. state of Georgia, Davis relocated to Atlanta, Georgia, in 1903 to attend Atlanta Baptist College (later known as Morehouse College). He worked his way through high school and college at Morehouse, and gained the attention of the college's first African American president, John Hope, while polishing the floor of his house. Hope, known as "the maker of college presidents," elevated Davis to a position in the college's business office. Davis completed the school's academic course in 1907 and graduated with a Bachelor of Arts (with honors) in 1911.

While attending Morehouse, Davis was a roommate of Mordecai Wyatt Johnson, who later served as president of Howard University; they remained longstanding friends. Davis and Johnson both played for Morehouse's football team; Davis was a defensive end. They befriended Charles H. Wesley in 1910 while playing for the team. In addition to Hope, Davis was influenced by Morehouse professors Samuel Archer and Benjamin Griffith Brawley. Davis attended Morehouse during the ongoing Atlanta Compromise debate between Booker T. Washington and W. E. B. Du Bois over the future of African American education. Davis sided with Du Bois in this ideological debate, and he "began to formulate his lifetime philosophies and commitment to the educational development of the black community." Davis received counsel from both Washington and Du Bois, and he remained a lifelong friend of Du Bois.

With Hope's encouragement, Davis completed graduate studies in chemistry and physics at the University of Chicago from 1911 to 1913. Davis and other African American students were able to attend the university by working after-hour and summer jobs, which were secured for them by an influential African American benefactor at Chicago's Union Stock Yards.

Davis commenced his career in education as a member of the Morehouse faculty, where he served as the registrar from 1914 to 1917, and as a professor of chemistry and physics. Davis also served on the college's standing committee on athletics, and taught physics for the college's academy. In 1915, Davis assisted African American educator and historian Carter G. Woodson in establishing the Association for the Study of Negro Life and History. He also helped Walter Francis White to found one of the city's first chapters of the National Association for the Advancement of Colored People (NAACP).

Throughout his early years in the segregated American South, Davis overcame racial discrimination, which included being forced out of a Mississippi town at gunpoint for entering a store that refused service to African Americans, and being prevented from attending an educational conference at Georgia State College by the Ku Klux Klan.

In 1917, Davis was hired as the executive secretary of the Twelfth Street Branch of the Young Men's Christian Association (YMCA) in Washington, D.C., by Jesse E. Moorland of the YMCA's Colored Men's Department. Davis served in this position until 1919.

President of West Virginia State College 
On August 20, 1919, Davis was selected to succeed Byrd Prillerman as the fifth president of West Virginia Collegiate Institute in Institute, West Virginia; he commenced his presidency on September 1, 1919. The institute had been founded in 1891 as the West Virginia Colored Institute, under the Morrill Act of 1890, to provide West Virginia's African Americans with education in agricultural and mechanical studies. Davis was elected as the school's president through his association with Morehouse president John Hope, and a personal recommendation from his friend Carter G. Woodson. While he had no previous experience as an educational administrator, Woodson promised to give him advice and assistance, so Davis accepted the position. Davis then invited Woodson to assist him by serving as the Academic Dean of the institute's college department. Woodson accepted this position because he was grateful to have employment, and the $2,700-per-year salary enabled him to operate his Journal of Negro History. Woodson had been offered the presidency of the West Virginia Collegiate Institute in 1919 but declined due to the administrative duties required to operate a college, as it would have left him with little time to research and write.

Expansion and improvement of the campus and curriculum 
Under Davis' leadership, West Virginia Collegiate Institute became one of the leading historically black colleges and universities and land-grant universities in the United States, in both academics and athletics. At the time of Davis' arrival, the institute suffered from depressed academic and physical conditions. He transformed the school's campus during his first ten years of leadership through the construction of new buildings. He also expanded and improved the school's academic programs and curriculum. Davis recruited some of the nation's preeminent African American educators to join the school's faculty. In 1922, Carter G. Woodson described the institute under Davis' leadership as "a reorganized college furnishing facilities for education not offered elsewhere for the youth of West Virginia."

The 1922 Biennial Report of the State Supervisor of Negro Schools of West Virginia noted "steady and commendable" progress had been made at West Virginia Collegiate Institute under Davis' management. The report stated that a new dormitory for female students had been erected, and many new volumes had been added to the school's library, and it also noted, "this institution is possibly the best equipped State-supported college for Negroes in America." Despite the school's progress under Davis, the report noted the institute's work was hampered by inadequate classroom facilities, and acknowledged the need for "an administration building, a gymnasium, library, and cottages for teachers."

Through Davis' efforts, West Virginia Collegiate Institute became the first African American college to be accredited by the North Central Association of Colleges and Schools (NCA) in 1927. In Davis' annual report for the school in 1927, he stated that the institute was the first ever U.S. college with an African American president and full African American faculty to become fully accredited. Davis later become the first African American member of NCA's Committee on Institutions of Higher Education. West Virginia Collegiate Institute changed its name to West Virginia State College in 1929, and it began conferring college degrees. Soon after this transition, West Virginia State became home to the West Virginia Schools for the Colored Deaf and Blind and to West Virginia's Extension Service for African Americans. Following the integration of West Virginia's graduate schools in 1939, Davis selected the first three African American students to be offered entrance into West Virginia University, one of whom was Katherine Johnson.

During his tenure as West Virginia State's president, the college's enrollment increased from around 20 students in 1919 to a peak enrollment of between 1,850 and 1,900 students at the time of his departure in 1953. Through his efforts and educational statesmanship, Davis laid the groundwork for West Virginia State's transition into an integrated institution. Davis supported the desegregation of schools over further equalization of African American institutions, and in 1946, he stated, "Negro education postulates doctrines of minimization of personality, social and economic mediocrity, and second class citizenship. The remaining task for it is to die. The aim of all segregated institutions should be to work themselves out of a job." Under Davis, West Virginia State began enrolling white students before 1950, in violation of state law, and it became the first historically black college to enroll large numbers of white students. White students began entering West Virginia State in increasing numbers during the final years of Davis' presidency, and the college ceased having a majority of African American students. By 1965, white students accounted for 71 percent of the college's enrollment. Davis resigned his position as president of the college in 1953, and was elected president emeritus of West Virginia State following his departure.

Early African American educational history of West Virginia 
Davis initiated a study of early African American educational history in West Virginia and appointed a committee to undertake the study's research and data collection. Carter G. Woodson served as the committee's chairperson and developed a questionnaire that was disseminated among West Virginia's African American communities and institutions to gather facts. At the conclusion of this study, Davis held a presentation of its findings as part of the West Virginia Collegiate Institute Founder's Day celebration on May 3, 1921. Many of the living pioneers of early African American education in West Virginia were invited to address this meeting to share their experiences. In 1922, Woodson published the study's findings in the article, "Early Negro Education in West Virginia," in his Journal of Negro History. In 1922, Woodson began receiving a grant from the Carnegie Corporation of New York for the operation of his Journal of Negro History and shortly thereafter, he resigned his position as dean of the West Virginia Collegiate Institute in June of that year. Davis accepted Woodson's resignation, and while he was disappointed in his decision, he understood Woodson's devotion to promoting African American history.

Extension Service and State 4-H Camp for African Americans 

Under Davis' leadership in the 1930s, West Virginia State College and its Extension Service were part of a movement to provide educational outdoor and recreational activities for West Virginia's African American youth. This movement received West Virginia Board of Control funding from the Works Progress Administration (WPA) when the West Virginia Legislature established Camp Washington-Carver in 1937 near Clifftop in Fayette County. The  African American 4-H camp was constructed by the WPA between 1939 and 1942 and under Davis' leadership. The camp was transferred from the West Virginia Board of Control to West Virginia State's Extension Service in 1942. Camp Washington-Carver was formally dedicated on July 26, 1942 in a ceremony attended by Davis. At the 4-H camp, West Virginia State's Extension Service offered instruction to African American children and adolescents in the subjects of agricultural education, soil conservation, home economics, and 4-H values. Later in 1949, the West Virginia Conservation Commission consulted Davis on the name for a state recreational area for African Americans near Institute, and following his recommendation, the Conservation Commission selected the name, Booker T. Washington State Park.

Civilian Pilot Training Program 
Davis began pursuing a pilot training program for West Virginia State in 1934 through a cooperative relationship between the college's vocational program and officials at nearby Wertz Field, adjacent to the campus. Following the outbreak of World War II in 1939, the United States government recognized a shortage of trained pilots. To mitigate this shortage, its Civil Aeronautics Authority (CAA) established the Civilian Pilot Training Program (CPTP) with the intention of creating pilot training programs at U.S. colleges and universities. According to West Virginia State's Dr. Charles Ledbetter, only 20 African Americans in the U.S. were licensed as pilots at the time of the CPTP's establishment. On September 11, 1939, Davis received approval from the CAA to establish a CPTP at West Virginia State—the first African American college in the U.S. to do so. Its CPTP was announced on September 18, along with that of the Agricultural and Technical College of North Carolina. West Virginia State's CPTP conducted flight instruction at nearby Wertz Field. In October 1939, Davis coordinated with the National Youth Administration to secure a mechanic work experience project as part of West Virginia State's CPTP.

One of the college's CPTP instructors, Dr. Charles Byrd, noted that West Virginia State's CPTP "played a part in the struggle to get African Americans accepted" into the United States Army Air Corps (USAAC). When the USAAC admitted the first African Americans and organized the 99th Flying Training Squadron, two of the first five commissioned African American pilots were graduates from West Virginia State's CPTP: George Spencer Roberts, the first African American appointed to the USAAC and Mac Ross. Another of the college's CPTP graduates was Rose Agnes Rolls of Fairmont, West Virginia, the first African American woman to receive flight training through the CAA and the first female solo pilot in the CPTP nationwide. Rolls and Joseph Greider, a West Virginia State music professor, later joined the West Virginia Civil Air Patrol, becoming the first African Americans in the state's air patrol. In the summer of 1940, West Virginia State became the first African American college to enroll white trainees into its CPTP. This served as a precedent for the racial integration of the United States Armed Forces. West Virginia State's CPTP was discontinued in 1942.

Army Specialized Training Program 

Also under Davis' leadership, West Virginia State received an Army Specialized Training Program (ASTP) unit. He was persistent in conveying the college's desire to have ASTP trainees on its campus. Davis had read about the ASTP in newspapers and in School and Safety, the American Council on Education's weekly newsletter, and he sent a letter on June 16, 1943 to the ASTP Director, United States Army Colonel Herman Beukema. Beukema responded by stating that the ASTP was using Howard University, Prairie View State College, and Agricultural and Technical College of North Carolina, which met current demands. He added that the army planned to give the college "an Army Specialized Training Unit at the earliest possible date."

Davis was only made aware that West Virginia State was receiving an ASTP unit two weeks before ASTP personnel arrived on its campus. On July 16, 1943, Colonel W. G. Johnston of the Army Service Forces' Fifth Service Command called Davis to inform him, and two days later, Johnston confirmed the tentative number of ASTP trainees, arrival date, and basic engineering courses to be offered, and that a contract "negotiating party" would soon visit the campus. Within a week's time, West Virginia State reached agreements with the Fifth Service Command, and Davis commenced modifications to the college's Gore Hall, where most of the ASTP personnel were housed. On July 22, 1943, Davis wrote to Johnston, requesting him to expand the anticipated total of 150 trainees to 300, an amount that included 17-year-old West Virginia reservists who were to attend ASTP training at other colleges and universities. In this letter, Davis assured Johnston, "the entire force of this college ... is now busy preparing for the arrival of AST trainees."

Nonpartisan leadership style 
Throughout his tenure as president of West Virginia State, Davis was able to govern the college with a surprising degree of independence and political nonpartisanship, despite its proximity to the state capitol in nearby Charleston. In a 1944 meeting of the West Virginia State faculty, Davis explained his disinterest in partisan politics to the college's faculty: "I have never felt it my duty to go and dabble in partisan politics. I hold the position that I have a unique place in the life of the state. You and I are to cooperate in guiding this school, that whatever party is in power, the success of the institution can be a credit to that party." However, Davis advocated the college's advancement in all matters in his correspondences with West Virginia state legislators and officials. He also leveraged his faculty as a resource for providing expertise and assistance to state politicians, regardless of their party. When a West Virginia state senator expressed an interest in having German papers translated, Davis recommended a West Virginia State faculty member to perform this task, and he assured the senator that the professor would remain "quiet" about their assistance. Davis believed that assistance provided by West Virginia State would be returned in the form of appropriations. Author Gerald L. Smith cited Davis' nonpartisan leadership style as being an influence on Rufus B. Atwood, president of Kentucky State College. Davis was also able to secure appropriations for the West Virginia State's buildings and equipment because the state's Democratic and Republican parties both vied for African American votes.

Associated Publishers, Inc. 
In June 1921, Davis and African American leaders including Carter G. Woodson, Don S.S. Goodloe, Mordecai Wyatt Johnson, and Byrd Prillerman, established Associated Publishers, Inc., in Washington, D.C., with a capital stock of $25,000. Davis and his fellow incorporators founded the firm after recognizing the need of "supplanting exploiting publishers" and to focus primarily on works by African American authors and on issues concerning the African American community. Davis served as the publishing firm's treasurer and Woodson served as its president.

United States Government service 
Throughout his lifetime, Davis was an adviser to five United States presidents, and he served in multiple roles in support of the United States federal government. He served as a member of the National Advisory Committee on Education of Negroes in 1929 and again from 1948 to 1951. In 1931, Davis was appointed a member of the President's Organization for Unemployment Relief under President Herbert Hoover. At the invitation of United States Secretary of State Cordell Hull, Davis participated in a conference on Inter-American relations in November 1939. In August 1941, Davis accepted an invitation from U.S. Treasury Secretary Henry Morgenthau Jr. to serve on West Virginia's Defense Savings Committee, which was responsible for promoting the purchase of savings bonds to finance national defense efforts. Following the passage of the National Science Foundation Act of 1950, President Harry S. Truman appointed Davis as a charter member to the first National Science Board for the National Science Foundation, on which he served from 1950 to 1956. Davis was also chairperson of the National Commission for the Defense of Democracy through Education.

In his final year as president of West Virginia State, Davis took a permanent leave of absence to embark on a career in foreign service. President Truman appointed him to serve, under the first African American United States Ambassador Edward R. Dudley, as the director of the Technical Cooperation Administration program in Liberia from 1952 to 1954. Davis served as a consultant to the Peace Corps in 1961, and as a consultant on minority hiring to the United States Department of State's United States Information Agency.

Civil Rights Movement 
Davis was among the vanguard of the American Civil Rights Movement. He was active in the National Urban League and served on its executive board. Davis also advised George Edmund Haynes and Eugene Kinckle Jones on the league's development. In 1928, he served as the president of the National Association of Teachers in Colored Schools (later known as the American Teachers Association). While Davis had not sought this leadership position, his peers believed he had the necessary leadership qualities to head the association during a pivotal time in African American education. In 1934, Davis wrote a pamphlet entitled, "Land-Grant Colleges for Negroes," for the West Virginia State College Bulletin and continued to expand this article into a book. He died in 1980 before it could be published.

Davis helped to establish the NAACP Legal Defense and Educational Fund (NAACP LDF), and he was elected to serve on its board of directors, two days after its inception in 1939. After accepting an invitation by Thurgood Marshall in 1955, Davis served as the special director of the NAACP LDF Teacher Information and Security Program, which he established to preserve the positions of African American educators. While at the NAACP LDF, Davis worked closely with Marshall, the fund's Chief Counsel, to prepare for the Brown v. Board of Education case. This case resulted in the landmark decision of the U.S. Supreme Court that U.S. state laws establishing racial segregation in public schools are unconstitutional, even if the segregated schools are otherwise equal in quality.

In his role as the special director of the NAACP LDF Teacher Information and Security Program, Davis fought for the protection of African American teachers, and for communities making the transition into integrated schools. Davis administered the NAACP LDF's scholarship programs for African American undergraduate, graduate, and professional students. During his 24 years in this role, the NAACP LDF provided more than 1,300 scholarships and grants to African American students. In 1964, Davis became the special director for the Herbert Lehman Educational Fund. He later became a consultant to the NAACP LDF in 1972 and served in this position until his death in 1980.

Davis was a close friend of Mary McLeod Bethune, founder of the National Council of Negro Women. He accompanied her on her first visit to the White House for her presentation on the problems facing African Americans to President Franklin D. Roosevelt.

Later life and death 
Davis and his wife relocated to Englewood, New Jersey, in 1954 following his departure from West Virginia State. In 1960, Davis was appointed to the United States National Commission for the United Nations Educational, Scientific and Cultural Organization (UNESCO).

He became a member of the Bergen County College board of trustees, and at the college's first annual commencement exercise in 1970, Davis delivered a speech against the Vietnam War in which he stated, "More than 42,000 young men of this nation have died in an undeclared war. No nation will win the Vietnam War and our continued participation in this war will weaken the vitality of America and destroy its substance." In his speech, Davis also challenged the graduates to, "Bring our peoples together, black and white, and repair the cracked Liberty Bell so that it can clearly and loudly proclaim liberty throughout the land."

In May 1973, Davis delivered the graduation commencement address at West Virginia State College, in which he told graduates that it was up to them to see that no more Watergates occur. Davis attended the first Seminar on Black Colleges and Universities in Nashville in November 1979 and participated in its study group to discuss the future missions of black colleges and universities.

Davis continued to work as an active consultant for the NAACP LDF and serve as the head of its Herbert Lehmann Fund until his death. He died of a heart attack at the age of 92 at his home in Englewood on July 12, 1980. A memorial service for Davis was held on July 18, 1980 at the First Baptist Church in Englewood. At the time of his death, Davis was engaged in a survey of all the United States African American land-grant colleges and universities.

Personal life

Marriages and children 
In 1916, Davis married Bessie Rucker (born July 13, 1890), the daughter of Georgia politician Henry Allan Rucker (1852–1924) and his wife, Annie Long Rucker (1865–1933). Rucker's father served as head of revenue collection in Georgia during the Reconstruction era, and her maternal grandfather, Jefferson F. Long (1836–1901), was Georgia's first African American congressperson in the U.S. House of Representatives. Davis and his first wife Bessie had two daughters: Constance Rucker Davis Welch and Dorothy Long Davis McDaniel.

Following several months of illness, Bessie Rucker Davis died of hepatocellular carcinoma on February 24, 1931 at Mountain State Hospital in Charleston at the age of 40, with her husband and sister Lucy Rucker Aiken at her bedside. Davis, his daughters Constance and Dorothy, and numerous friends and faculty from West Virginia State College, traveled together to Atlanta for the memorial service. Her funeral was held at the Rucker family home in Atlanta and featured a violin solo by Kemper Harreld. Bessie Rucker Davis was interred at Atlanta's Oakland Cemetery.

On September 2, 1932, Davis married Ethel Elizabeth McGhee, an educator and activist for African American social advancement, and dean of women at Spelman College. Davis and McGhee were married in Englewood, New Jersey, after which, she resigned her position at Spelman and relocated to West Virginia State with Davis. Davis and McGhee had one daughter together: Caroline "Dash" Florence Davis Gleiter (November 19, 1933 – January 26, 2004).

Residences 

Throughout his entire 34-year tenure as president of West Virginia State, Davis resided at East Hall on the college's campus. In 1937, Davis had the house moved from the east side of campus to its current location to make room for a new physical education building. According to Davis' second wife Ethel, the couple held parties on East Hall's large porch, and Ethel held receptions for visiting dignitaries and for freshman and senior students. Guests of the Davises at East Hall included Eleanor Roosevelt, Langston Hughes, W.E.B. Du Bois, George Washington Carver, and Ralph Bunche. The Davises continued to reside at East Hall while it was being moved across campus. After relocating to Englewood, New Jersey, with his wife in 1954, Davis resided there for 26 years until his death in 1980.

Honors and awards

Honorary degrees 
Davis was a recipient of 14 honorary degrees, including the degrees listed below.

Davis also received honorary doctorates from West Virginia State College and Harvard University.

Orders and fraternities 
In 1948, Davis was awarded the National Order of Honour and Merit, Haiti's highest order of merit awarded by its president, for "increasing the understanding and good will existing between Haiti and the United States of America." He was awarded the Order of the Star of Africa by Liberia in 1955 for strengthening the "bonds of friendship" between Liberia and the U.S.

Davis was a member of the Sigma Pi Phi and Phi Beta Kappa honor society fraternities, and he was a 33rd Degree Mason and a Prince Hall Mason.

Awards 
Davis was awarded the William E. Harmon Foundation Award for Distinguished Achievement Among Negroes for education in 1926. Just prior to his death in 1980, he was honored by the National Education Association (of which he was a member) with its Harper Council Trenholm Award.

Legacy 
Davis' lifelong personal and professional pursuits were focused on the economic and educational development of the African American community, the improvement of relations between African Americans and other groups, and the improvement of relations between the United States and developing black nations. With a tenure spanning 34 years, Davis is the longest-serving president of West Virginia State College, which became West Virginia State University in 2004. The university's Davis Fine Arts Building is named in his honor; he delivered the principal address at its public dedication in 1965.

Hugh M. Gloster, president of Morehouse College, hailed Davis as "one of the outstanding American leaders of the twentieth century." In Black Colleges and Universities: Challenges for the Future (1984), editor Antoine Garibaldi remarked of Davis' involvement with the book's preparation:Even at 92, [Davis] was still progressive in his thinking and believed as strongly as any member of the group that black colleges would have to alter their missions to adapt to a changing clientele of students, changing demographics and political trends, and economic conditions that have adversely affected the financial health of most institutions of higher learning. Dr. Davis leaves a legacy for all educators to emulate. He will be missed by all those who had the good fortune to know him, but his contributions to education, to civil rights, and to the United States will live on.

Selected works

References

Explanatory notes

Citations

Bibliography

External links
 

1888 births
1980 deaths
19th-century African-American people
20th-century African-American educators
Academics from Georgia (U.S. state)
Academics from West Virginia
African-American publishers (people)
American academic administrators
American expatriates in Liberia
Educators from Georgia (U.S. state)
Educators from West Virginia
Morehouse College alumni
Morehouse College faculty
NAACP activists
National Education Association people
People from Atlanta
People from Englewood, New Jersey
People from Institute, West Virginia
People from Milledgeville, Georgia
Educators from Washington, D.C.
Presidents of West Virginia State University
UNESCO officials
United States Department of State officials
United States National Science Foundation officials
University of Chicago alumni
YMCA leaders
20th-century American academics
20th-century African-American academics
African-American academic administrators